The Czechoslovakia men's national under-19 volleyball team represented Czechoslovakia in international men's volleyball competitions and friendly matches under the age 19 and it was ruled by the Czechoslovak Volleyball Federation which was a member of the Federation of International Volleyball (FIVB) and also a part of European Volleyball Confederation (CEV).

Results

FIVB U19 World Championship
 Champions   Runners up   Third place   Fourth place

The Czechoslovakia men's national under-19 volleyball team did not compete in any European youth Championship because the team was dissolved in late 1992 before the first European youth championship took place in 1995.

References

External links

Official website
FIVB profile

National men's under-19 volleyball teams
Volleyball in Czechoslovakia